Conicotheca nigrans is a species of benthic Foraminifera that was first identified from samples collected from the Challenger Deep in the Mariana Trench. C. nigrans has a test or outer shell of agglutinated organic materials and minerals. As a species belonging to a  basal clade of foraminifera, the order Allogromiida, C. nigrans may be informative about the evolution of the forams.

References 

Monothalamea
Species described in 2008